Eight ships of the Royal Navy have been named HMS St George, after Saint George, the patron saint of England:

, a 60-gun ship built in 1622 and sunk in 1697 as a blockship.
, a ship captured in 1626 and listed until 1632.
HMS St George was a 96-gun first rate launched in 1668 as HMS Charles and renamed in 1687.  Rebuilt several times and broken up in 1774.
 was a hulk at Harwich bought in 1701 from M. Stevens; she was sunk in 1716 as a foundation for Chatham Dockyard.
 was a 98-gun second rate, launched in 1785 and wrecked in 1811.
HMS St George was originally HMS Britannia of 1762, renamed HMS Princess Royal in 1812, HMS St George a few days later, and then HMS Barfleur in 1819.  She was broken up in 1825.
 was a 120-gun first rate, launched in 1840 and sold in 1883.
 was a shore based training school on the Isle of Man set up by the Royal Navy in Sep 1939.

See also
HMS St George, a former Royal Navy shore establishment in Eastney, Portsmouth, Hampshire, England

References

Royal Navy ship names